Queen Elizabeth's Grammar School may refer to:

 Queen Elizabeth's Grammar School, Ashbourne, England
 Queen Elizabeth's Grammar School, Alford, Lincolnshire, England
 Queen Elizabeth's Grammar School for Boys, Barnet, England
 Queen Elizabeth's Grammar School, Blackburn, England
 Queen Elizabeth's Grammar School, Darlington, England (now Queen Elizabeth Sixth Form College)
 Queen Elizabeth's Grammar School, Faversham, Kent, England
 St Anne's Academy, formerly Queen Elizabeth's Grammar School, Middleton, Greater Manchester, England
 Queen Elizabeth's Grammar School, Horncastle, Lincolnshire, England
 Queen Elizabeth's Grammar School, Crediton, Devon, England

Queen Elizabeth Grammar School may refer to:

 Queen Elizabeth Grammar School, Wakefield, England
 Queen Elizabeth Grammar School, Penrith, England
 Queen Elizabeth Grammar School, Carmarthen
 Queen Elizabeth Grammar School, Gainsborough

See also
 Queen Elizabeth School (disambiguation)
 Queen Elizabeth Elementary School (disambiguation)